Elmer Francis Quinn (June 16, 1895 – September 2, 1952) was an American lawyer and politician from New York.

Life
He was born in Manhattan, New York City on June 16, 1895, and attended Grove Street Grammar School No.3 and Townsend Harris High school. He graduated from City College of New York and Fordham University School of Law. He practiced law in New York City, and for some time was confidential secretary to George W. Olvany.

On January 7, 1926, Quinn was elected to the New York State Senate to fill the vacancy caused by the resignation of Jimmy Walker who had been elected Mayor of New York City. Quinn remained in the State Senate until his death in 1952, serving in the 149th through the 168th New York State Legislatures. He was Minority Leader in the State Senate from 1945 to 1952.

He died on September 2, 1952 at St. Luke's Hospital in Manhattan, New York City.

References

1895 births
1952 deaths
Democratic Party New York (state) state senators
People from Manhattan
City College of New York alumni
Fordham University School of Law alumni
20th-century American politicians